Grosse Ile (French: large island) or Grosse Isle may refer to:

Places in Canada
 Grosse Isle, Quebec, an island where many Irish Immigrants to Canada were housed and the site of the Grosse Isle Disaster
 Grosse-Île, Quebec, one of two municipalities forming the urban agglomeration of Îles-de-la-Madeleine in Quebec, Canada
Grosse Isle, Manitoba, a small community in Manitoba, Canada

Places in the United States
 Grosse Ile Township, Michigan, United States
Grosse Ile (Michigan), the largest island in the township
Grosse Isle, Louisiana, an unincorporated community in Louisiana, United States